Jose Prakash (14 April 1925 – 24 March 2012) was an Indian actor and singer who worked in Malayalam cinema. He was a singer turned actor who had appeared in more than 300 films mostly in antagonist roles. He was awarded with the J. C. Daniel Award in 2011, a day before he died aged 86. In a career spanning for around 40 years,  he is known for portraying some of the iconic villain characters in the Malayalam film industry. Later, he switched to character roles in the mid 90s.

Personal life

He was the eldest of the eight children of Kunnel K.J. Joseph & Eliyamma Joseph on 14 April 1925 at Changanassery, Kottayam. He has four younger brothers and three sisters, among whom the youngest brother, Prem Prakash, is also an actor. He had his primary education from Sacred Heart Public School, Kottayam. He was settled around 30 years in Madras and later moved to Cochin. In 2003 his right leg had to be amputated due to Diabetes. He was married to Chinnamma, who predeceased him. They have 6 children, 2 sons and 4 daughters: Elsamma Thomas (nee Joseph), Rajan Joseph, Gracy Maliakal, Shaji Joseph, Jasmine Joseph, and Susan Joseph. He lived with his youngest son Shaji Joseph in Cochin till his death on 24 March 2012.

Script writers Bobby-Sanjay and Malayalam movie director Dennis Joseph are his nephews.

Early career

Jose Prakash was in the Indian army before entering the film industry. While in the army he had the rare distinction to serve as the body guard of Mahatma Gandhi during the time of partition. Like other actors of that age he was not a theatre or stage artist. He had served for Indian army for 8 years. He later left army and return to his homeland and start small business. Having interest in  cinema and music from childhood he started a small club with his friends called Kottayam Arts Club in which he was the lead singer. Thikkurissy Sukumaran Nair once saw his performance and called him as a singer for his debut directorial film  Sheriyo Thetto. It was Thikkurissy who gave him the name Jose Prakash.

Film career

Singer

Jose Prakash started his early career as a singer who lend his voice for Prem Nazir, Sathyaneshan Nadar etc. Malayalam industry was not professional at early 1950s usually actors sing for themselves. Thikkurissy Sukumaran Nair  introduced him to V. Dakshinamoorthy who liked his voice and lend his voice for the film Sheriyo Thetto in 1953 directed by  Thikkurissy Sukumaran Nair. In this film philosophical number "Paadu pettu paadangalil" sung by Jose Prakash introduced a new trend in Malayan cinema. He also did a small role in the movie. He was not at all a professional singer and does not attend any musical class. In the early 1960s Malayalam film industry became professional and the introduction of talented singers like A. M. Rajah, K. J. Yesudas ended the careers of all non professional singers. Up to the 1960s he had sung around 60 songs for various actors like Prem Nazir etc.

Actor

During his singing career he had done small roles and cameos for films. His first break as an actor was Bhakta Kuchela in 1961. But his major break as a villain was Olavum Theravum in 1969 and he later went on to do many films mostly in villain roles. In 1971, he acted in the first ever investigative sequel C.I.D. Nazir (1971) directed by P. Venu. Later he worked with P. Venu in many of his films. He and K. P. Ummer dominated Malayalam film industry in the role of Antagonist and was a hard target for Heroes. Up to date he had acted for more than 350 films in Malayalam language. He retired from film industry in 2003 due to health reasons. His last film was Ente Veedu Appuvinteyum directed by Sibi Malayil. After a long gap of 8 years he did a small cameo role in Traffic.

Awards
Kerala State Television Awards
1993:Kerala State Television Award For Best Actor - Mikhayelinte Santhathikal
2006 Bahadoor Award
2011 J C Daniel Award

Filmography

As an actor 

Traffic     2011
	Highway Police       2006 as Father John
	Mr. Brahmachari       2003
	Ente Veedu Appuvinteyum 	2003
Kanalkkireedam      2002
The Gift Of God 2002
	Pathram 	            1999
	Vazhunnor 	            1999 as Bishop
	Meenathil Thalikettu 	1998
	Man of the Match 	1996
Thumbolikkadappuram      1995
Agrajan      1995
Highway      1995
Puthran      1994 as michael
	Bheesmacharya 	1994
	Chukkan 	1994 as Narayanan
	Akashadoothu 	1993
	Devasuram 	1993
Mayaamayooram      1993
	Maanthrika Cheppu 	1992
Ragam Anuragam  1991
Kadalora Kattu 1991
	Indrajaalam 	1990
	Orukkam 	1990 as Father Francis Arakkal
Kadathanadan Ambadi      1990
	Veena Meettiya Vilangukal 	1990
	Kottayam Kunjachan	1990
Ee Kannikoodi 	1990
Adikkurippu 	1989
	Adharvam 	1989
Kodugallur Bagavathi      1989
	Dhinarathrangal 	1988
	Loose Loose Arappiri Loose 	1988
	Vrutham	1987 as Jailor
	Aankiliyude Tharattu 	1987
	Oru Sindoora Pottinte Ormaykku 	1987
Aalippazhangal      1987 as Sekharan Thampi
	Rajavinte Makan	1986
	Kshamichu Ennoru Vakku 	1986
Sayam Sandhya           1986
	Snehamulla Simham 	1986
Niramulla Raavukal 1986 as Sudevan
	Adukkan Entheluppam 	1986
Rajavinte Makan      1986
Aayiram Kannukal      1986
	Ente Kanakkuyil 	1985
	Eeran Sandhya 	1985
 Akalathe Ambili (1985) as Kurichan
Akkachide Kunjuvava      1985
Upahaaram      1985 as Fernandez
. Sammelanam 1985  as Ananthan Nambiar
Madhuvidhu Theerum Munpe      1985
	Ee Sabdam Innathe Sabdam 	1985
	Aa Neram Alppa Dooram 	1985
	Nirakkoottu 	1985
	Parannu Parannu Parannu 	1984
	Koottinilamkili 	1984
	Piriyilla Naam 	1984
Jeevitham      1984
Pavam Poornima 1984 as Thampi
Thacholi Thankappan      1984 as Guptha
Manithali      1984
Oru Kochu Kadha Arum Parayatha Kadha (1984) as Advocate
	Swanthamevide Bandhamevide 	1984
Sabadham  1984 as Viswanadhan Thampi
Kurishuyudham (1984) as Father Fernandez
Koodevide      1983
 Himam (1983) as Jaykkal
Nadi Muthal Nadi Vare      1983
Passport      1983
Ahankaram      1983
Oru Mukham Pala Mukham 	1983
	Belt Mathai 	1983...Alexander
Kodumkattu      1983
Ankam      1983 as Chacko
Maniyara     1983
Enne Njan Thedunnu      1983 as Doctor Earadi
	Koodevide	1983
	Sara Varsham 	1982
Rakthasakshi      1982
Aarambham     1982 as Sebastian
Aranjaanam  1982 as Colonel
Shila     1982
Ahimsa      1982
Drohi      1982
Chilanti Vala      1982
Panchajanyam as Madhavan Thampi
Saram      1982
Aasha as Mathew Cheriyan
Dheera      1982
Shaari Alla Sharada     1982
	Ithu Njangalude Katha 	1982
Kaliyamardhanam      1982
	John Jaffer Janardhanan 	1982
	Ithiri Neram Othiri Karyam 	1982
Oru Vilippadakale 1982 as Dr Cheriyan
Saahasam      1981
Kilugaatha Changalakal      1981
Nizha Yudham      1981
Choothattam      1981
	Aarathi 	1981
	Thrishna 	1981 as K V S Panikkar
	Raktham 	1981
	Ahimsa 	1981
Agnisharam      1981
Thadavara     1981 as Kollakkaran
Karimpoocha      1981
Sambhavam      1981
Swarnappakshikal      1981
Adimachangala      1981
Maniyan Pilla Adhava Maniyan Pilla 1981 as Parameshwaran Pilla
Agni Yudham      1981
Prema Geethangal 1981 as P K Panikkar
Ariyappedatha Rahasyam 1981 as Sreedharan thampi (P. Venu)
Love In Singapore 	1980
Air Hostess 1980 as Menon
Chandrahasam 1980 as Rathnakaran
Agnikshetram 1980 as Vishwanathan
	Manushya Mrugam 	1980 as K. G. Menon
	Shakthi 	1980
Kadalkkattu      1980
Prakadanam      1980 as Damodharan
Anthapuram      1980
Edan Thottam      1980
Avan Oru Ahankari      1980
Ival Ee Vazhi Ithu Vare      1980
Baktha Hanuman      1980
Aagamanam 1980 as Issac
Agniparvatham      1979
	Puthiya Velicham 	1979
	Avano Atho Avalo 	1979 as Surendran
	Mamangam 	1979
Yakshipparu      1979
Irumbazhikal 1979 as Swami
Pichathikuttappan   1979  (P. Venu)
Alavuddinum Albutha Vilakkum      1979
Vijayanum Veeranum      1979 as Surendran Nair
Tharangam     1979 as Gopalan
Indradhanussu 1979 as Rappai
Thuramugham      1979
Kathirmandapam      1979
Ward No.7   1979  (P. Venu)
Sarppam      1979
Vaaleduthavan Valaal      1979
Rakthamillatha Manushyan 1979 as Menon
Vijayam Nammude Senani      1979
Peruvazhiyambalam      1979
Prabhu 1979 as Gauri Sankar Prasad
	Eeta 	1978
	Beena 	1978
	Aval vishwathayayirunnu  	1978 as Psychiatrist
Velluvili     1978 as Minnal Moidu
Yaagaaswam      1978
Amarsham      1978
Itha Oru Manushyan      1978 as Narayanan Thampi
Aalmarattam   1978  (P. Venu)
	Lisa 	1978
Rajan Paraja Kadha      1978
Ithanente Vazhi      1978
Avakaasham      1978
Kudumbam Nammukku Sreekkovil      1978 as Dharmapalan
Aanakkalari      1978
Rowdy Ramu      1978
Kanalkkattakal      1978 as Vikraman/Prasad
Padmatheertham      1978 as Achutha Kurup
Aval Kanda Lokam      1978
 Karimpuli 1978
Ashokavanam      1978
Ee Ganam Marakkumo      1978
Urakkam Varatha Rathrikal 1978 as Balagangadhara Menon
Arum Annyaralla      1978 as Priest
Randu Lokam 1977 as Thamarasheri Gopala Kurup
Aval Oru Devalayam      1977
Sathyavan Saavithri 1977 as Ashwapathi
Nirakudam      1977
Rajaparambara      1977
Aadyapaadam      1977
Sujatha      1977
Madura Swapnam      1977
Parivarthanam      1977
Minimol      1977
Sangamam      1977
Vezhambal      1977
Innale Innu      1977
Sankupushppam      1977 as Dr. Jose
Sukradasa      1977
Shanta Oru Devatha      1977
Abhinivesham      1977 as C. P. Menon
Sreemad Bhagavath Geetha      1977
Muttathe Mulla      1977 as Thampi
Sagakkale Munnottu      1977
Udyanalakshmi      1976
Seemantha Puthran      1976
Agni Pushppam      1976
Paarijatham      1976
Ozhukkinethire      1976
Rajaankanam      1976
Neelasaari      1976
Amba Ambika Ambalika      1976
Themmadi Velappan      1976 as Balakrishnan
Light House      1976
Chirkudukka      1976 as Kumar
Nee Ente Lahari    1976
Amma      1976
Picnic  (1975) as Mooppan
Chumaduthaangi  1975
Babumon      1975 as Puli Naanu
Hello Darling     1975 as Krishna Kumar
Omanakunju      1975
Thomasleeha      1975
Pulivalu     1975
Makkal      1975
Raagam      1975
Ullasa Yaathra      1975
. Pravaham 1975 as Bhaskaran
Mattoru Seetha      1975
Love Marriage     1975 as Prakash
Love Letter      1975
Chandanachola      1975
Odakuzhal      1975
Sooryavamsham      1975
Priye Ninakku Vendi      1975
	Pancha Thanthram 	1974 as Prasad
Sapthaswarangal   1974 as Madhava Das
Honeymoon   1974
College Girl  1974 as Nanu
Shaapamoksham  1974
Poothenaruvi  1974
Pattabhishekam    1974
Ankathattu   1974
Rahasya Raathri   1974
	Jesus 	1973
Panchavadi     1973 as Shekhar
Padmavyooham    1973 as Mathachan
Ajaathavasam    1973 as Jayaraj
Kaapalika     1973
Panitheeratha Veedu 1973 as Hari's father
Badradeepam   1973 as Venugopal
Thaniniram   1973 as Mathai/Mathew Philip
Police Ariyaruthu 1973 as Alex
Pacha Nottukal   1973 as Mathews Muthalali
Prethagalude Thazvara  1973 (P. Venu)
Swapnam     1973
Maasappadi Mathupilla   1973
Veendum Prabhatham   1973
Rakkuyil   1973
Thekkankattu  1973 as Sebastain
Pushppanjali     1972 as Damu
Sree Guruvayoorappan   1972
Sambhavami Yuge Yuge   1972 as Balaram
Aneshwanam
Taxi Car   1972 as Shivaram
Nirthasaala   1972 as Dayananthan
Aaradi Manninte Janmi   1972 as Dr. Menon
Shakthi   1972
Manthrakodi  1972
Brahmachari    1972
Prathikaram 1972 as Sreedharan Thampi
Avalalppam Vaikipoyi   1971
Jalakanyaka   1971
Makane Ninakku Vendi (1971) ...Pappachan
Thapaswini    1971
Vilakkyu Vaangiya Veena     1971 as K.R.Das
Achante Bharya    1971 as Rajan
Muthassi    1971
Lankadahanam    1971 as Das
C.I.D. Nazir 1971 as Shivaram (P. Venu)
Nilakkatha Chalanagal  1970
Nizhalattam 1970 as Bhaskaran
Abayam   1970
Lottery Ticket   1970
Madhuvidhu     1970 as Sathi's Father
Aranaazhikaneram (1970) as Priest
	Ollavum Theeravum 	1970
Kattukurangu    1969
Kannur Deluxe    1969 as Gopalakrishnan
Rahasyam     1969 as Karadi Damodharan
Chattambikkavala   1969
Kumara Sambhavam (1969) as Devandran
Velutha Kathreena   1968 as Superintend Manoharan
Love in Kerala   1968
Agniputhri      1967
Subaida    1965
Karutha Kai  1964 as Madhava Menon
Adya Kiranangal  1964 as Damodaran
Kattumaina 1963
Snapaka Yohannan  1963 as Snapaka Yohannan
Ammaye Kaanaan  1963 as Advocate
	Bhaktha Kuchela 	1961 as Nandagopan
Chathurangam 1959
Mariakutty  1958 as Ponnappachan
Devasundari 1957
Padatha Painkili 1957 as Pothachan
Manthravaadi 1956
Harishchandra 1955
CID 1955
Aniyathi 1955 as Doctor
Harischandra 1955
Balyasakhi 1954
Manasakshi 1954
Sheriyo Thetto     1953  -Debut Film as singer and actor
Alphonsa  (1952)
Premalekha  (1952)

As a singer
"Om Namashivaaya" - Love in Kerala (1968)
"Oronnoro Chenchorathan" - Avan Varunnu (1954)
"Neelippenne" - Manasakshi (1954)
"Kannuneer Nee Choriyaathe" - Sheriyo Thetto (1953)
"Paadupettu Paadangalil" - Sheriyo Thetto (1953)
"Thaarame Thaanuvaru" - Sheriyo Thetto (1953)
"Vaarmazhaville Va" - Sheriyo Thetto (1953)
"Pokaam Pokaam" - Sheriyo Thetto (1953)
"Kelkuka Ha" - Alphonsa (1952)
"Chinthayil Neerunna" - Visappinte Vili (1952)
"Ramanan" - Visappinte Vili (1952)

As a Television actor
Akashadoothu (TV series) (2012)- A teleserial from Surya TV which is the sequel of the hit Malayalam film Akashadoothu
Mikhaelinte Santhathikal - as Mikhael (Doordarshan)
Vava (Asianet)
Avashthantarangal (Kairali TV)

Further reading
Jose Prakash Celebrating his 84th birthday-http://www.ratedesi.com/video/v/XJgxBIs0Hpk/Actor-Jose-Prakash-celebrates-84th-birthday!

References

Sources

External links
 

1925 births
2012 deaths
J. C. Daniel Award winners
Kerala State Film Award winners
21st-century Indian male actors
Male actors from Kottayam
Male actors in Malayalam cinema
Indian male film actors
20th-century Indian male actors
Indian male television actors
Male actors in Malayalam television
Indian male playback singers
20th-century Indian singers
Singers from Kerala
People from Changanassery
20th-century Indian male singers